Rhinophis phillipsi, commonly known as Phillips' earth snake, is a species of nonvenomous snake in the family Uropeltidae. The species is endemic to Sri Lanka.

Etymology
The specific name, phillipsi, is in honor of British naturalist Major William Watt Addison Phillips (1892–1981).

See also
Genus Uropeltis.

References

Further reading
de Silva A, Goonewardene S, Bauer A, Austin CC, Drake J, de Silva P (2005). "Notes on the snakes inhabiting the Knuckles massif with special reference to Uropeltis melanogaster (Gray, 1858) and Uropeltis phillipsi (Nicholls, 1929)". Lyriocephalus 6: 149–159.
Nicholls, Lucius (1929). "A new species of Earth Snake of the genus Silybura ". Spolia Zeylanica (Colombo) 15 (2): 153–155. (Silybura phillipsi, new species).
Smith, Malcolm A. (1943). The Fauna of British India, Ceylon and Burma, Including the Whole of the Indo-Chinese Sub-region. Reptilia and Amphibia. Vol. III.—Serpentes. London: Secretary of State for India. (Taylor and Francis, printers). xii + 583 pp. (Uropeltis phillipsi, new combination, p. 87).

External links

phillipsi
Reptiles of Sri Lanka
Endemic fauna of Sri Lanka
Reptiles described in 1929